Sericogyra metallica is a species of extremely small deep water sea snail, a marine gastropod mollusk in the family Seguenziidae.

Distribution
This marine species occurs off the coast of New Zealand.

References

External links
 To Encyclopedia of Life
 To World Register of Marine Species

metallica
Gastropods described in 1988